The coat of arms of the Cook Islands has a shield as its focal point. The shield is blue with fifteen white stars arranged in a circle, as found on the national flag, and is supported by a flying fish (maroro) and a white tern (kakaia). The helmet is an ariki head-dress (pare kura) of red feathers, symbolising the importance of the traditional rank system, and the name of the nation is on a scroll below the shield. The achievement is augmented by a cross and a Rarotongan club (momore taringavaru) used by orators during traditional discourses, respectively symbolizing Christianity and the richness of Cook Islands' tradition, placed in saltire behind the shield.

The coat of arms was designed by Papa Motu Kora, a mataiapo, a traditional chiefly title from the village of Matavera in Rarotonga.

References

National symbols of the Cook Islands
Cook Islands
Cook Islands
Cook Islands
Cook Islands
Cook Islands
Cook Islands
Cook Islands